Malayang Kilusan ng Mamamayang Zambaleño (MAKIMAZA) is a local political party from the province of Zambales. The Party was founded in 2018 by incumbent Zambales Governor Amor Deloso.

References

Politics of Zambales
Local political parties in the Philippines
Liberal parties in the Philippines
Political parties established in 2018
2018 establishments in the Philippines